The Leone II Cabinet was the 22nd cabinet of the Italian Republic. 

The government resigned on 19 November 1968, following the positions taken by the Republicans, Socialists, Social Democrats and Christian Democrats of opening for the formation of a new coalition Government.

Composition

|}

References

Italian governments
1968 establishments in Italy
1968 disestablishments in Italy
Cabinets established in 1968
Cabinets disestablished in 1968